Kaarlo Linkola (surname until 1906 Collan; 1888–1942) was a Finnish botanist and phytogeographer.

Linkola was docent of botany at Helsinki University 1919–1922. He was professor of botany at University of Turku from 1922, and at Helsinki University from 1925 (in a newly established second chair of botany). He was head of the botanical institute from 1926, dean of the Faculty of Science for two periods (1930–1933 and 1936–1938) and rector of Helsinki University 1938–1941.

Linkola's doctoral dissertation (1916) dealt with the impact of culture of vegetation in Southern Karelia. Much later Ilkka Hanski used Linkola's data on plants associated with villages isolated in the boreal forest landscape matrix to illustrate his core-satellite hypothesis.

Linkola made a unique contribution to the understanding of regeneration in herbaceous plant communities in studying the natural occurrence of seedlings in meadows and on cliffs.

Linkola and his students made a suite of investigations of root architecture. These studies are amongst the earliest in a still oft-neglected field. The last of these reports was published quite a while after Linkola's early death.

Kaarlo Linkola was member of the Finnish Academy of Science and Letters. He co-founded the Finnish Union for Nature Protection and was its first chairman. He was father of Pentti Linkola. He is buried in the Hietaniemi Cemetery in Helsinki.

Sources
 Bo-Jungar Wikgren: "Pages of the History of Biology in Finland"

Selected scientific works

1888 births
1942 deaths
People from Joensuu
People from Kuopio Province (Grand Duchy of Finland)
20th-century Finnish botanists
Finnish ecologists
University of Helsinki alumni
Academic staff of the University of Helsinki
Burials at Hietaniemi Cemetery
Rectors of the University of Helsinki